Bolesław Józef Habowski (13 September 1914 – 21 May 1979) was a Polish football player from interwar period, representing Wisła Kraków and Poland national football team.

Habowski's debut in the National Team occurred on 10 October 1937 in Warsaw (Poland – Yugoslavia 4–0). His second and last game in white-red jersey took place in Riga, 25 September 1938 (Latvia – Poland 2–1) scoring a goal in the match.

He played in forward, was regarded as a very fast and tough player, who never gave up. In the years 1934–1938 he played in all Wisła Kraków's games in Polish Soccer League. Then, sometime between late 1938 and early 1939, he was purchased by a rising power of Polish soccer, the team of Junak Drohobycz. During the September Campaign, he was captured by the Soviets and forcefully taken to Siberia. In 1942 he managed to get to the Polish Army in Soviet Union, created by General Władysław Anders. From there, across Africa, he arrived in England, where he stayed and eventually died.

See also
 Polish Roster in World Cup Soccer France 1938

References

1914 births
1979 deaths
Polish footballers
Polish expatriate footballers
Poland international footballers
Wisła Kraków players
FC Spartak Moscow players
Expatriate footballers in the Soviet Union
Polish expatriate sportspeople in the Soviet Union
Expatriate footballers in England
Polish expatriate sportspeople in England
1938 FIFA World Cup players
Polish military personnel of World War II
Footballers from Kraków
Polish Austro-Hungarians
Association football forwards
Soviet Top League players